Tim Willis is a paralympic athlete from the United States, competing mainly in category T11 distance runner events.

Willis competed in the 2000 Summer Paralympics where he took part in the T11 5,000 m and won a bronze medal in the T11 10,000 m.

He also competed in the 1996 Summer Paralympics in Atlanta.  He placed 2nd in the 10K run.  Before that, Willis won the gold medal in the 10K at the World Championships in Berlin IN 1994.

References

Paralympic track and field athletes of the United States
Athletes (track and field) at the 2000 Summer Paralympics
Paralympic bronze medalists for the United States
American male long-distance runners
Living people
Medalists at the 2000 Summer Paralympics
Year of birth missing (living people)
Paralympic medalists in athletics (track and field)
Visually impaired long-distance runners
Paralympic long-distance runners